Wetrom bin Bahanda (born 26 May 1971) is a Malaysian politician who has served as the Member of Parliament (MP) for Kota Marudu since November 2022 and Member of the Sabah State Legislative Assembly (MLA) for Bandau since September 2020. He served as the State Assistant Minister to the Chief Minister of Sabah in the Gabungan Rakyat Sabah (GRS) state administration under Chief Minister Hajiji Noor from October 2020 to his resignation in October 2022. He is a member of the Social Democratic Harmony Party (KDM) and was a member of the Malaysian United Indigenous Party (BERSATU), a component party of the ruling Perikatan Nasional (PN) and GRS as well as formerly the Pakatan Harapan (PH) coalitions and was a member of the United Malays National Organisation (UMNO), a component party of the ruling Barisan Nasional (BN) coalition. He has also served as the 1st Deputy President of KDM for the Muslim bumiputera quota since October 2022.

Election results

Honours
  :
  Commander of the Order of Kinabalu (PGDK) - Datuk (2011)

References

Members of the Sabah State Legislative Assembly
Former United Malays National Organisation politicians
Former Malaysian United Indigenous Party politicians
Living people
1971 births